A gurdwara (or , , meaning "the doorway to the Guru") is the Sikh place of worship and may be referred to as a Sikh temple.

Asia

India

Assam
Gurdwara Sri Guru Tegh Bahadur Sahib

Bihar
Takht Sri Patna Sahib
Gurdwara Guru Ka Bagh
Gurudwara Ghai Ghat
Gurdwara Handi Sahib
Gurdwara Gobind Ghat
Gurdwara Bal Lila Maini Sangat

Chandigarh
Gurdwara Koohni Sahib

Delhi
Gurudwara Bangla Sahib
Gurdwara Dam Dama Sahib
Gurdwara Sri Guru Singh Sabha
Gurdwara Mata Sundri
Gurdwara Nanak Piao
Gurdwara Rakab Ganj Sahib
Gurudwara Sis Ganj Sahib

Gujarat
Lakhpat Gurdwara Sahib, Lakhpat

Haryana
Gurdwara Nadha Sahib, Panchkula
Gurdwara Toka Sahib, Toka, Naraingarh

Himachal Pradesh
Chail Gurudwara. Chali
Dera Baba Vadbhag Singh Gurudwara, Mairi, Una district
Gurudwara Paonta Sahib, Paonta Sahib
Manikaran Sahib, Manikaran

Jharkhand
Gurdwara Guru Singh Sabha, Kedli Kalan

Karnataka
Guru Nanak Jhira Sahib, Bidar
Gurdwara Sri Guru Singh Sabha, MG Road

Maharashtra
Gurudwara Guru Nanak Dharamsal Puraatan, Aurangabad Maharashtra
Gurudwara Khalsa Sabha, Matunga, Mumbai
Hazur Sahib, Nanded

Punjab
Goindwal Sahib, Tarn Taran
Gurdwara Baba Atal, Amritsar 
Gurdwara Baba Bakala Sahib, Baba Bakala
Gurudwara Baba Gurditta, Chandpur Rurki
Gurdwara Dukh Nivaran Sahib, Patiala
Gurdwara Fatehgarh Sahib, Fatehgarh Sahib
Gurdwara Guptsar Sahib, Chhattiana
Gurdwara Jyoti Sarup, Fatehgarh Sahib
Gurdwara Karamsar Rara Sahib, Rara Sahib
Gurdwara Likhansar Sahib, Talwandi Sabo
Gurdwara Mata Sunder Kaur, Mohali
Gurudwara Nagiana Sahib, Udoke, Batala
Gurudwara Naulakha Sahib, Naulakha
Gurdwara Parivar Vichhora, Majri, Rupnagar district
Gurdwara Patal Puri Sahib, Kiratpur Sahib
Gurudwara Sahib Bibi Sharan Kaur Ji Raipur, Chamkaur Sahib
Gurdwara Sahib Patshahi Chhevi, Khurana
Gurdwara Sri Tarn Taran Sahib, Tarn Taran
Gurusar Sahib,  Lal Kalan, Ludhiana district
Harmandir Sahib, Amritsar
Manji Sahib, Alamgir, Ludhiana district
Mehdiana Sahib, Mehdiana, Ludhiana district 
Sri Akal Takht Sahib, Amritsar
Takht Sri Damdama Sahib, Talwandi Sabo
Toot Sahib, Amritsar
Takht Kesgarh Sahib, Anandpur Sahib

Rajasthan
Gurudwara Buddha Johad, Sri Ganganagar district

Sikkim
Gurdwara Nanaklama, Chungthang

Uttarakhand 
Gurudwara Shri Hemkund Sahib, Chamoli district
Gurudwara Sri Gobind Ghat, Govindghat
Gurudwara Nanakmatta Sahib, Nanakmatta
Gurudwara Reetha Sahib, Champawat district
Guru Ram Rai Darbar Sahib, Dehradun

Uttar Pradesh
Guru ka Tal, Agra

Pakistan

Punjab
Gurdwara Beri Sahib, Sialkot
Gurdwara Darbar Sahib Kartarpur, Kartarpur
Gurdwara Dera Sahib, Lahore
Samadhi of Ranjit Singh, Lahore
Gurdwara Janam Asthan Guru Ram Das, Lahore
Gurdwara Janam Asthan, Nankana Sahib
Gurdwara Chowa Sahib, Jhelum
Gurdwara Panja Sahib, Hasan Abdal
Gurdwara Makhdoom Pur Pahoran, Makhdoom Pur Pahuran
Gurdwara Rori Sahib, Eminabad
Shahid Ganj Bhai Taru Singh, Lahore
Gurdwara Shahid Ganj Sighnian, Lahore

Sindh
Shri Swaminarayan Mandir, Karachi

Other locations in Asia

Afghanistan
Gurdwara Karte Parwan, Kabul

Bangladesh
Gurdwara Nanak Shahi, Dhaka

Hong Kong
Khalsa Diwan Sikh Temple

Iran
Masjid-e-Hindan, Tehran

Malaysia
Gurdwara Sahib Klang, Selangor

Philippines
Nanak Darbar Indian Sikh Temple, Iloilo City

Singapore
Central Sikh Temple

Africa

Kenya
Sikh Temple Makindu, Makindu

Europe

United Kingdom

North America

Canada
Gur Sikh Temple, Abbotsford, British Columbia
Khalsa Diwan Society Vancouver, Vancouver
Ontario Khalsa Darbar, Ontario

See also
 List of places visited by Guru Nanak
 List of Sikh festivals

References

External links
 World Gurudwaras

 
Sikhism-related lists